Nanaimo Airport  is a privately owned and operated regional airport located  south southeast of Nanaimo, British Columbia, Canada.

In 1999, the air terminal was named in honour of World War I ace Raymond Collishaw who was born in Nanaimo. The Nanaimo-Collishaw Air Terminal is the passenger terminal for the airport.

The Nanaimo Airport currently has only one available runway for instrument flight rules (IFR) conditions, runway 16. This is because the approach to the north-facing runway (runway 34) is a dogleg approach that follows the Ladysmith Harbour.

Expansion
In 2010, the Nanaimo Airport Commission announced the completion of a significant runway expansion. The runway length increased by almost  to accommodate larger aircraft, as well as the addition of a third taxiway (labelled Charlie), to allow direct access to the threshold of runway 16. 

Shortly after the runway expansion, Nanaimo Airport saw an increase in commercial traffic because of the subsequent installation of an advanced instrument landing system (ILS) and associated lighting on the south-facing runway 16. This would soon attract the likes of WestJet Encore and Air Canada Rouge among the existing services offered by Jazz Aviation.

Between April 2019 and March 2020, a major terminal expansion took place, increasing the terminal's screening capacity from 100 passengers per hour to 1,000 passengers per hour. The apron was also expanded to compensate for the 60% size increase of the new terminal building.

The air terminal saw 435,000 passengers pass through its gates in 2018.

Airlines and destinations
Nanaimo Airport provides service to Vancouver, Calgary, and Edmonton via Air Canada Express, WestJet Encore and WestJet Link.

Passenger

See also
Nanaimo Harbour Water Aerodrome
List of airports on Vancouver Island

References

External links
 

Certified airports in British Columbia
Buildings and structures in Nanaimo
Transport in Nanaimo